Prince Joachim Franz Humbert of Prussia (17 December 1890 – 18 July 1920) was the youngest son and sixth child of Wilhelm II, German Emperor, by his first wife, Augusta Victoria of Schleswig-Holstein. He committed suicide at age 29.

Prince Joachim was educated as an officer and participated in the First World War. During the war, he was considered a candidate for several newly established monarchies in Europe.

His great-grandson is Grand Duke George Mikhailovich, the heir apparent to Maria Vladimirovna, a claimant to the disputed Headship of the Imperial Family of Russia.

Early life

Birth and family
Prince Joachim was born on 17 December 1890, two years after his father had become the German Emperor, at the Berlin Palace in central Berlin. He was the sixth and youngest son of Emperor Wilhelm II, and his first wife, Princess Augusta Victoria of Schleswig-Holstein.

Education
Prince Joachim spent his childhood with his siblings at the New Palace in Potsdam, and his school days at the Prinzenhaus in Plön, in his mother’s ancestral Schleswig-Holstein, as his brothers had been before him.

Marriage

On 11 March 1916 in Berlin, Joachim married Princess Marie-Auguste of Anhalt (10 June 1898 – 22 May 1983), the daughter of Eduard, Duke of Anhalt and his wife Princess Luise of Saxe-Altenburg (daughter of Prince Moritz of Saxe-Altenburg). He and Marie-Auguste had been engaged since 14 October of the previous year. The wedding was celebrated at Bellevue Palace, and was attended by Joachim's father and mother, the Duke and Duchess of Anhalt, as well as other relatives. They had a simple Lutheran ceremony.

The couple had one son, Prince Karl Franz Josef Wilhelm Friedrich Eduard Paul (15 December 1916 in Potsdam – 22 January 1975 in Arica, Chile). Their grandson, Prince Franz Wilhelm, married Maria Vladimirovna of Russia, a claimant to the Imperial Russian throne.

Candidate for thrones

Ireland
During the Easter Rising in Dublin in 1916, some republican leaders, including Patrick Pearse and Joseph Plunkett, contemplated giving the throne of an independent Ireland to Prince Joachim. Pearse and Plunkett thought that if the rising were successful and Germany won the First World War, an independent Ireland would be a monarchy with a German prince as king, like Romania and Bulgaria before it.

The fact that Joachim did not speak English was also considered an advantage, as he might be more disposed to learning and promoting the use of the Irish language.

In his memoirs, Desmond FitzGerald wrote: 
"That would have certain advantages for us. It would mean that a movement for de-anglicisation would flow from the head of the state downwards, for what was English would be foreign to the head of the state. He would naturally turn to those who were more Irish and Gaelic, as to his friends, for the non-nationalist element in our country had shown themselves to be so bitterly anti-German.......For the first generation or so it would be an advantage, in view of our natural weakness, to have a ruler who linked us with a dominant European power, and thereafter, when we were better prepared to stand alone, or when it might be undesirable that our ruler should turn by personal choice to one power rather than be guided by what was most natural and beneficial for our country, the ruler of that time would have become completely Irish."

Ernest Blythe recalls that in January 1915 he heard Plunkett and Thomas MacDonagh express support for the idea at an Irish Volunteers meeting. Bulmer Hobson, secretary of the Volunteers, was among the attendees. No objections were made by anyone and Blythe himself said he found the idea "immensely attractive".

Georgia
After Georgia's declaration of independence following the Russian Revolution of 1917, Joachim was briefly considered by the German representative Count Friedrich Werner von der Schulenburg and Georgian royalists as a candidate to the Georgian throne.

Lithuania
The Council of Lithuania declared Lithuania's independence on February 16, 1918, but the council was unable to form a government, police, or other state institutions due to the continued presence of German troops. The Germans presented various proposals to incorporate Lithuania into the German Empire, particularly Prussia. 

One such proposal offered the crown of Lithuania to Joachim. The Lithuanians resisted this idea and hoped to preserve their independence by creating a separate constitutional monarchy. On 4 June 1918, they voted to offer the Lithuanian throne to the German noble Wilhelm Karl, Duke of Urach.

Divorce and death
Following the German Revolution in November 1918, the Emperor was forced to abdicate, thus depriving Joachim of his titles and position. Unable to accept his new status as a commoner, he fell into a deep depression.

The relationship between Joachim and his wife had already started to deteriorate. The couple were divorced soon after the end of the First World War. The direct causes of the divorce are not known to the public. According to one report, Marie-Auguste had previously abandoned her husband and child to run away with another man, had been forcibly brought back home on the orders of the Kaiser, and had filed for divorce as soon as the war ended, when she saw that her husband's family were at their lowest ebb.

Following the divorce, Joachim shot himself in Potsdam on 18 July 1920. One source reports that he had been in financial straits and suffered from "great mental depression". His own brother Prince Eitel Friedrich of Prussia commented that he suffered from "a fit of excessive dementia".

Children and grandchildren
The only issue of the marriage of Prince Joachim and Princess Marie-Auguste was their son, Prince Karl Franz Josef Wilhelm Friedrich Eduard of Prussia (15 December 1916 – 22 January 1975).

On 5 October 1940, Prince Karl married Princess Henriette Hermine Wanda Ida Luise von Schönaich-Carolath (25 November 1918 – 16 March 1972). They divorced on 5 September 1946. They were the parents of three children:

Prince Franz Wilhelm Viktor Christoph Stephan of Prussia (born 3 September 1943), he married Maria Vladimirovna, Grand Duchess of Russia, a claimant to the disputed Russian throne. Their child is Grand Duke George Mikhailovich of Russia, Prince of Prussia, born 13 March 1981 in Spain.
Prince Friedrich Christian Ludwig of Prussia (3 September 1943 – 26 September 1943)
Prince Franz Friedrich Christian of Prussia (born 17 October 1944).

After the divorce, Prince Karl married, morganatically, Luise Dora Hartmann (5 September 1909 – 23 April 1961) on 9 November 1946. The childless couple divorced in 1959.

Prince Karl's last marriage was to Eva Maria Herrera y Valdeavellano (10 June 1922 – 6 March 1987) on 20 July 1959 in Lima, Peru. They were married until Prince Karl's death and had two daughters;

Alexandra Maria Augusta Juana Consuelo Prinzessin von Preussen (born 29 April 1960)
Désirée Anastasia Maria Benedicta Prinzessin von Preussen (born 13 July 1961).

Regimental Commissions
  Leutnant (2nd Lieutenant), 1. Garderegiment zu Fuß (1st Regiment of Foot Guards)
  à la suite, 4. Gardegrenadierlandwehrregiment (4th Reserve Regiment of Grenadier Guards)

Honours
He received the following orders and decorations:

Ancestry

Portrayal in fiction
Prince Joachim was played by American actor Jesse Plemons in the 2021 Disney fantasy adventure film Jungle Cruise.

References

1890 births
1920 suicides
Prussian princes
German royalty
Suicides by firearm in Germany
Prussian Army personnel
Monarchy in Ireland
Recipients of the Iron Cross (1914), 1st class
Grand Crosses of the Order of Saint Stephen of Hungary
Recipients of the Order of the Netherlands Lion
Annulled Honorary Knights Grand Cross of the Royal Victorian Order
Sons of emperors
Children of Wilhelm II, German Emperor
Sons of kings